Norris Gene Cole II (born October 13, 1988) is an American professional basketball player who plays for Atléticos de San Germán of the Baloncesto Superior Nacional (BSN). A 6'2" point guard, he is a two-time NBA champion, winning back-to-back titles in 2012 and 2013 with the Miami Heat in his first and second years in the NBA. In his seven NBA seasons, Cole made the playoffs all but once (2016).

High school and college career
Cole was a star at Dunbar High School in Dayton, Ohio, leading his basketball team to consecutive state championships in his junior and senior years. He was a high school teammate of future NBA player Daequan Cook (The two later faced each other in the 2012 NBA Finals).

Cole was set to go to Walsh University on a football scholarship when Cleveland State basketball coach Gary Waters decided to recruit him. On December 15, 2008, he helped lead Cleveland State to their biggest regular season victory in school history, upsetting the #11 Syracuse Orange, 72–69. It was CSU's third-ever win over a Top 25 ranked opponent, and first ever on the road. They would pick up their fourth and fifth wins over Top 25 opponents later that same season when they won at #17 Butler in the championship game of the Horizon League Tournament 57–54, and then in the first round of the 2009 NCAA Tournament when, as the 13th seeded team in the Midwest bracket, they routed 4th seeded and #12 Wake Forest by a final score of 84–69. His numbers improved over the course of his college basketball career, which culminated in a senior year that saw him average 21.7 points, 5.8 rebounds, 5.3 assists and 2.2 steals per game, highlighted by a 41-point, 20-rebound, 9-assist performance against Youngstown State.

Cole was recognized for his accomplishments by being the first person in the Horizon League's men's basketball history to be named both Player of the Year and Defensive Player of the Year, earning an AP All-America Honorable Mention, making the USBWA District V team, as well as the National Association of Basketball Coaches District 12 First Team. He was also a finalist for the Wooden Award and a "Final Five" finalist for the Bob Cousy Award.

Cole played 140 career games for Cleveland State, averaging 14.1 points, 3.2 rebounds, and 3.3 assists in 29.4 minutes per game. On February 6, 2016, Cole's No. 30 jersey was retired by Cleveland State during a pre-game ceremony.

Professional career

Miami Heat (2011–2015)

Cole was drafted by the Chicago Bulls in the first round of the 2011 NBA draft as the 28th pick out of Cleveland State, but in a series of draft night deals, his rights were subsequently traded to the Minnesota Timberwolves, who then dealt him to the Miami Heat.

After a solid preseason when he averaged 21.3 points and 8 assists, he impressed a nationwide audience in the Heat's home opener against the Boston Celtics by scoring 15 points in the 4th quarter (making many crucial shots in the closing minutes) to secure a Heat victory in the face of a Celtic's comeback attempt. Cole finished that game with a total of 20 points, 4 assists, 4 rebounds, and 3 steals. He became the 4th fastest rookie in Heat franchise history to score at least 20 points in a game.

Cole was originally left out of the 2012 Rising Stars Challenge, but due to the rising stardom of Jeremy Lin, who was added late to the group, Cole was selected as the 20th rookie in order to even out the competition. He tallied 18 points, 6 assists, and 4 steals in the game.

Cole finished the 2011–2012 season averaging 6.8 points, 1.4 rebounds, and 2.0 assist on 39% shooting, serving as the team's backup point guard behind Mario Chalmers. He made two big 3-pointers in Game 4 of the 2012 NBA Finals which would spark a comeback run. Cole won his first championship in his rookie season after the Miami Heat defeated the Oklahoma City Thunder 4–1.

Cole played in 80 games in the 2012–2013 season, including 4 starts, and averaged 5.6 points and 2.1 assists. In the playoffs, Cole averaged 6 points a game, including two straight 18-point games against the Chicago Bulls in games 2 and 3 of their second-round series. He would be ejected from Game 7 of the 2013 Eastern Conference Finals by referee Ken Mauer after a shoving match with Indiana Pacers forward Jeff Pendergraph, who was also ejected late in the fourth quarter during a 26-point Miami Heat lead. Miami would advance to the Finals, Cole's second trip. Miami pushed the San Antonio Spurs to 7 games and won the title for Cole's second championship.

In the 2013–2014 season, Cole played in all 82 games and started in six games, averaging 6.4 points and 3 assists per game. In the playoffs, Cole scored 13 points in game 4 of the Heat's first round sweep of the Charlotte Bobcats, and would not score in double figures again until Miami's crucial game 2 victory against the Pacers in the Eastern Conference Finals, posting 11 points with two three-point baskets. Miami defeated Indiana 4 games to 2 to advance to their fourth straight Finals and Cole's third. The Heat would once again face the San Antonio Spurs in the 2014 NBA Finals, but Miami would lose the series in five games. Cole was the only Heat player who had a contract going through the 2014–15 season.

On October 29, 2014, Cole started his first time opening night game and subsequently scored a career-high 23 points in the 107–95 win over the Washington Wizards. In 47 games played and started 23 games with Heat in 2014–15 regular season, Cole averaged 6.3 points, 3.5 assists, 2.3 rebounds, .9 steals, playing 24.4 minutes per game before being traded.

New Orleans Pelicans (2015–2016)
On February 19, 2015, Cole was traded to the New Orleans Pelicans in a three-team trade involving the Phoenix Suns. Two days later, he made his debut for the Pelicans against his former team, the Miami Heat. In just under 30 minutes off the bench, he recorded 12 points, 6 rebounds and 3 assists in a 105–91 win. Cole became a replacement for the injured Jrue Holiday. The Pelicans made the playoffs but were swept in their first round match-up against the eventual champions, the Golden State Warriors. In the 2014–15 NBA playoffs Cole averaged 8.8 points, 1.8 assists, 1.8 rebounds, 26.5 minutes per game; in 28 games played during the regular season (with the Pelicans), he averaged 9.9 points, 3.2 assists, 1.8 rebounds, with 44.4% shooting and 37.8% three-point shooting on 24.4 Minutes per game.

In June 2015, the Pelicans tendered a $3.037 million qualifying offer to make Cole a restricted free agent. On September 17, 2015, Cole re-signed with the Pelicans, accepting the one-year, $3.03 million qualifying offer. On December 1, Cole played his first game of the 2015–16 season after missing the Pelicans' first 17 games with a left ankle injury. In just under 23 minutes of action off the bench, he scored 11 points in a loss to the Memphis Grizzlies, as the Pelicans dropped to a 4–14 win–loss record to start the season. On January 2, 2016, he recorded his second career double-double with 16 points and a career-high 12 rebounds in a 105–98 win over the Dallas Mavericks. On February 6, he scored a career-high 26 points in a loss to the Cleveland Cavaliers. In the 45 games he played with the Pelicans during the 2015–16 season, Cole started 23 games, finishing with averages of 10.6 points, 3.4 rebounds, 3.7 assists, .8 steals, playing 26.6 minutes per game. Cole missed his first and only NBA playoff appearance with the Pelicans in the 2015–16 season.

Shandong Golden Stars (2016)
On October 5, 2016, Cole signed with Shandong Golden Stars of the Chinese Basketball Association. On November 30, 2016, he was released by Shandong. In 9 games played for Shandong, Cole averaged career high 19.1 points per game, 2.5 rebounds, 4.3 assists, 1.6 steals per game.

Oklahoma City Thunder (2017)
On March 1, 2017, Cole signed with the Oklahoma City Thunder. In 13 games played for the Thunder, Cole averaged 3.3 points and 1.1 assists in 9.6 minutes per game.

Maccabi Tel Aviv (2017–2018)
On August 15, 2017, Cole signed a one-year deal with the Israeli team Maccabi Tel Aviv of the EuroLeague. On November 30, 2017, Cole recorded a season-high 26 points, shooting 4-of-6 from three-point range, along with 5 rebounds and 4 assists in an 81–74 win over Žalgiris.

Cole helped Maccabi win the 2018 Israeli League Championship, winning his third career title. In 28 EuroLeague games played during the 2017–18 season, Cole averaged 12.6 points, 2.5 rebounds, 3.8 assists, and 1.1 steals per game.

Sidigas Avellino (2018)
On August 17, 2018, Cole signed with Italian basketball team Sidigas Avellino for the 2018–19 LBA season. On October 7, 2018, Cole made his debut with Avellino in 98–81 win over Red October Cantù, recording 21 points, three rebounds and a career-high 13 assists. Two days later, Cole recorded a career-high 34 points, along with 5 rebounds and 7 assists in a 100–93 win over Nizhny Novgorod. He was subsequently named Champions League Gameday 1 MVP. On October 23, 2018, Cole recorded 33 points, shooting 7-of-13 from 3-point range, along with eight rebounds and nine assists in a 105–102 overtime win over Anwil Włocławek. He was subsequently named Champions League Gameday 3 MVP. In 19 games played for Avellino, Cole averaged 16.3 points, 3.4 rebounds and a career-high 6.2 assists.

On December 21, 2018, Cole parted ways with Avellino due to financial difficulties.

Budućnost (2018–2019)
On December 21, 2018, Cole joined the Montenegrin team Budućnost Podgorica of the ABA League and the EuroLeague, signing for the rest of the season. On December 28, 2018, Cole made his debut in an 88–93 loss to Bayern Munich, recording 27 points and six assists off the bench. In 15 Euroleague games played and 12 games started, he averaged 16.6 points, 2.7 rebounds, and 4.6 assists in 26.6 minutes per game.

Monaco (2019–2020)
On October 6, 2019, Cole joined Maccabi Haifa for their 2019 NBA pre-season tour.

On November 11, 2019, Cole signed a one-year deal with Monaco of the French LNB Pro A. On November 20, 2019, he made his debut in a 77–75 win over Maccabi Rishon LeZion, recording 18 points and three assists off the bench.

ASVEL (2020–2021)
During the 2020–21 season, Cole played for ASVEL Basket, averaging 13.7 points and 3.6 assists per game. He parted ways with the team on July 11, 2021.

Unicaja Malaga (2021–2022)
On August 19, 2021, Cole signed with Unicaja of the Liga ACB. On March 21, 2022, the club reached a mutual parting agreement with Cole.

JL Bourg (2022)
On March 21, 2022, he has signed with JL Bourg of the LNB Pro A.

Grand Rapids Gold (2022–2023)
On November 4, 2022, Cole was named to the opening night roster for the Grand Rapids Gold. On Jan. 27, 2023, the Gold waived Cole.

Career statistics

NBA

Regular season 

|-
|style="text-align:left;background:#afe6ba;"|†
| style="text-align:left;"| Miami
| 65 || 2 || 19.4 || .393 || .276 || .776 || 1.4 || 2.0 || .7 || .0 || 6.8
|-
|style="text-align:left; background:#afe6ba;"|†
| style="text-align:left;"| Miami
| 80 || 4 || 19.9 || .421 || .357 || .650 || 1.6 || 2.1 || .7 || .1 || 5.6
|-
| style="text-align:left;"|
| style="text-align:left;"| Miami
| 82 || 6 || 24.6 || .414 || .345 || .779 || 2.0 || 3.0 || .9 || .1 || 6.4
|-
| style="text-align:left;"|
| style="text-align:left;"| Miami
| 47 || 23 || 24.4 || .386 || .265 || .696 || 2.3 || 3.5 || .9 || .2 || 6.3
|-
| style="text-align:left;"|
| style="text-align:left;"| New Orleans
| 28 || 2 || 24.4 || .444 || .378 || .743 || 1.8 || 3.2 || .5 || .3 || 9.9
|-
| style="text-align:left;"|
| style="text-align:left;"| New Orleans
| 45 || 23 || 26.6 || .405 || .324 || .800 || 3.4 || 3.7 || .8 || .1 || 10.6
|-
| style="text-align:left;"|
| style="text-align:left;"| Oklahoma City
| 13 || 0 || 9.6 || .308 || .231 || .800 || .8 || 1.1 || .6 || .0 || 3.3
|-class="sortbottom"
| style="text-align:center;" colspan="2"| Career
| 360 || 60 || 22.3 || .407 || .324 || .743 || 2.0 || 2.7 || .8 || .1 || 7.0

Playoffs 

|-
|style="text-align:left;background:#afe6ba;"|2012†
| style="text-align:left;"| Miami
| 19 || 0 || 8.9 || .324 || .250 || .778 || .5 || .6 || .4 || .0 || 1.8
|-
|style="text-align:left;background:#afe6ba;"|2013†
| style="text-align:left;"| Miami
| 21 || 0 || 19.9 || .480 || .531 || .737 || 1.9 || 2.0 || .7 || .1 || 6.1
|-
| align="left" | 2014
| align="left" | Miami
| 20 || 0 || 20.2 || .410 || .375 || .867 || 1.1 || 1.8 || .5 || .1 || 4.6
|-
| align="left" | 2015
| align="left" | New Orleans
| 4 || 0 || 26.5 || .417 || .214 || .667 || 1.8 || 1.8 || .0 || .3 || 8.8
|-
| align="left" | 2017
| align="left" | Oklahoma City
| 4 || 0 || 6.1 || .250 || .250 || .0 || .3 || .3 || .0 || .3 || 1.2
|-class="sortbottom"
| style="text-align:center;" colspan="2"| Career
| 68 || 0 || 16.5 || .421 || .382 || .783 || 1.2 || 1.4 || .4 || .0 || 4.3

EuroLeague

|-
| style="text-align:left;"| 2017–18
| style="text-align:left;"| Maccabi
| 28 || 3 || 24.5 || .417 || .319 || .817 || 2.5 || 3.8 || 1.1 || .1 || 12.6 || 11.1
|-
| style="text-align:left;"| 2018–19
| style="text-align:left;"| Budućnost
| 15 || 12 || 26.6 || .493 || .380 || .857 || 2.7 || 4.6 || .8 || .0 || 16.6 || 15.2
|-
|- class="sortbottom"
| style="text-align:center;" colspan="2"| Career
| 43 || 15 || 25.2 || .447 || .345 || .829 || 2.5 || 4.1 || 1.0 || .0 || 14.0 || 12.5

Domestic Leagues

|-
| style="text-align:center;" rowspan=1| 2016–17
| style="text-align:left;" rowspan=1| Shandong Golden Stars
| style="text-align:center;" rowspan=1| CBA
| 9 || 27.5 ||  .412 || .286 || .769 || 2.5 || 4.3 || 1.6 || .0 || 19.1
|-
| style="text-align:center;" rowspan=1| 2017–18
| style="text-align:left;" rowspan=1| Maccabi Tel Aviv
| style="text-align:center;" rowspan=1| IPL
| 32 || 22.9 || .418 || .231 || .791 || 2.1 || 3.5 || 1.1 || .1 || 11.8
|-
| style="text-align:center;" rowspan=1| 2018–19
| style="text-align:left;" rowspan=1| Sidigas Avellino
| style="text-align:center;" rowspan=1| LBA
| 10 || 30.1 || .434 || .327 || .719 || 3.2 || 6.1 || 1.2 || .0 || 16.3
|-
| style="text-align:center;" rowspan=1| 2018–19
| style="text-align:left;" rowspan=1| Budućnost Podgorica
| style="text-align:center;" rowspan=1| ABA
| 17 || 25.0 || .460 || .291 || .750 || 3.5 || 4.3 || 1.0 || .0 || 13.2
|-
|}

College

|-
| style="text-align:left;"| 2007–08
| style="text-align:left;"| Cleveland State
| 34 || 0 || 14.4 || .380 || .238 || .817 || 1.4 || 0.8 || 0.6 || 0.0 || 4.9
|-
| style="text-align:left;"| 2008–09
| style="text-align:left;"| Cleveland State
| 35 || 33 || 32.8 || .453 || .305 || .804 || 2.5 || 2.4 || 1.2 || 0.1 || 13.3
|-
| style="text-align:left;"| 2009–10
| style="text-align:left;"| Cleveland State
| 33 || 33 || 34.2 || .432 || .342 || .799 || 2.8 || 4.4 || 1.8 || 0.1 || 16.3
|-
| style="text-align:left;"| 2010–11
| style="text-align:left;"| Cleveland State
| 36 || 36 || 35.7 || .439 || .342 || .853 || 5.8 || 5.3 || 2.2 || 0.1 || 21.7
|-class="sortbottom"
| style="text-align:center;" colspan="2" | Career
| 138 || 102 || 29.4 || .435 || .321 || .826 || 3.2 || 3.3 || 1.5 || 0.1 || 14.1

Personal life
Cole was a member of the National Honor Society and served as the salutatorian of his high school senior class. He earned a bachelor's degree in health sciences from Cleveland State.

He is the cousin of retired defensive end Trent Cole.

See also

References

External links

 
 Norris Cole at euroleague.net
 Norris Cole at nba.com/heat

1988 births
Living people
20th-century African-American people
21st-century African-American sportspeople
African-American basketball players
American expatriate basketball people in France
American expatriate basketball people in Israel
American expatriate basketball people in Italy
American expatriate basketball people in Montenegro
American men's basketball players
AS Monaco Basket players
ASVEL Basket players
Baloncesto Málaga players
Basketball players from Dayton, Ohio
Chicago Bulls draft picks
Cleveland State Vikings men's basketball players
JL Bourg-en-Bresse players
KK Budućnost players
Lega Basket Serie A players
Maccabi Tel Aviv B.C. players
Miami Heat players
New Orleans Pelicans players
Oklahoma City Thunder players
Point guards
Shandong Hi-Speed Kirin players
S.S. Felice Scandone players
United States men's national basketball team players